Tyrconnel is a rural locality split between the Maranoa Region and the Shire of Murweh, both in Queensland, Australia.

Geography 
The majority of the locality is in the Maranoa Region with only some small areas on the western boundary of the locality being within Shire of Murweh.

The higher northern land is generally undeveloped with the north-western corner of the locality being within the protected are of Chesterton Range National Park which extends west into neighbouring Redford. The land in the southern part of the locality is predominantly used for grazing.

History 
The locality takes its name from the pastoral station Tyrconnell Downs, which was named by John McManus after the Earl of Tyrconnell in Ireland.

References 

Maranoa Region
Shire of Murweh
Localities in Queensland